Gert Thys (born 12 November 1971) is a male long-distance runner from South Africa, who represented his native country in the marathon at the 1996 and 2004 Summer Olympics. Thys is a former African record holder in the marathon, and is the current holder of the South African record with his best of 2:06:33 from the 1999 Tokyo International Marathon, which was also the course record for that race.

Biography
Thys was born in Prieska, Northern Cape. He represented South Africa in the marathon at four consecutive editions of the World Championships in Athletics from 1999 to 2005. He has also competed at the IAAF World Half Marathon Championships on three occasions, highlighted by top six finishes in 1997 and 1998. Thys is a two-time winner of the Beppu-Ōita Marathon and his time of 2:08:30 set in 1996 remains the course record. He was also a cross country runner earlier on in his career and was the 1994 winner of the Chiba International Cross Country.

He also had success in East Asia at the Seoul International Marathon, where he won three times between 2003 and 2006, as well as taking the runner-up spot in 2005. However, he was disqualified after his 2006 win because his doping test at the race was positive for the banned steroid norandrosterone. Thys contested the outcome and a protracted hearing following his competitive ban by Athletics South Africa eventually resulted in his exoneration. Laboratory errors in processing his sample meant the Court of Arbitration for Sport CAS found in his favour. In May 2010 the Federal Supreme Court of Switzerland overruled this decision, declaring that the CAS has no jurisdiction over this case. Thys successfully argued to the court that the fact that the same technician had analysed both his positive samples (a breach of the anti-doping rules) had meant that the validity of the tests could not stand. His doping ban was overturned on this basis in 2012 and he was re-instated as the winner of the 2006 Seoul Marathon.

His extensive running career, which began at the age of thirteen, has taken in around forty competitive marathons. He came close to victory at the 2010 Beijing Marathon, but he slowed in the final stages and was runner-up to Siraj Gena.

Achievements

References

External links

 Marathon Info profile
 



1971 births
Living people
People from Siyathemba Local Municipality
Cape Coloureds
South African male long-distance runners
South African male marathon runners
Athletes (track and field) at the 1996 Summer Olympics
Athletes (track and field) at the 2004 Summer Olympics
Olympic athletes of South Africa
World Athletics Championships athletes for South Africa
Sportspeople from the Northern Cape